Diepold III, Margrave of Vohburg (c. 1079 – 1146), also known as Diepold von Vohburg and Diepold III von Giengen, was a Bavarian noble in the 12th century. He had two wives. His daughter with Adelaide of Poland (daughter of Władysław I Herman and Judith of Swabia), Adelheid of Vohburg, was the first wife of Frederick I, Holy Roman Emperor. Their son Diepold IV died in 1130.
His second wife was Kunigunde von Beichlingen (b. about 1095; d. 8 June 1140). Their daughter Kunigunde von Vohburg (c. 1131 - 22 November 1184) married Ottokar III of Styria.

The title had originally referred to the families' holdings along the border with Bohemia, but after Diepold's death the title was transferred to the Bavarian lands proper of the family.

In 1133 Diepold III founded a Cistercian abbey at Waldsassen.

Sources
 

Margraves of Germany
1070s births
1146 deaths